The 1997 FA Charity Shield (known as the Littlewoods FA Charity Shield for sponsorship reasons) was the 75th FA Charity Shield, an annual football match played between the winners of the previous season's Premier League and FA Cup competitions. The match was played on 3 August 1997 at Wembley Stadium and contested by Manchester United, who had won the 1996–97 FA Premier League, and Chelsea, who had won the 1996–97 FA Cup. Manchester United won the match 4–2 on penalties after the match had finished at 1–1 after 90 minutes.

The 1997 Charity Shield was a game of several "firsts". Manchester United's only goal of open play was from Ronny Johnsen, who scored his first goal in a competitive game for them. It was the first competitive appearance in a Manchester United shirt for Johnsen's teammate Teddy Sheringham, who had joined the club from Tottenham Hotspur five weeks earlier. It was also the first competitive appearance in a Chelsea shirt for goalkeeper Ed de Goey.

Match details

See also
1996–97 FA Premier League
1996–97 FA Cup

FA Community Shield
Charity Shield 1997
Charity Shield 1997
FA Charity Shield 1997
Comm
FA Charity Shield